The Bihar Regiment is an Indian Army infantry regiment. It traces its origins back to the British Indian Army. The Bihar Regiment was formed in 1941 by regularising the 11th (Territorial) Battalion, the 19th  Hyderabad Regiment, and raising new battalions. The Bihar Regimental Centre (BRC) is located at Danapur Cantonment, Patna, the second oldest cantonment of India. INS Vikramaditya, the Indian Navy's largest ship and one of its two aircraft carriers is affiliated to the Bihar Regiment, Indian Army's highly decorated and battle-hardened unit. The regiment also distinguishes itself by having the highest number of Rashtriya Rifles battalions (4 battalions: 4RR, 24RR, 47RR, 63RR) among all regiments of the Indian Army.

Bihari martial tradition

The martial tradition of Bihar troops in the era of British rule traces its origins to the 34th sepoy battalion raised in 1757 by Lord Clive of the British East India Company at Patna. The battalion was formed by men entirely from the Bhojpur (Arrah) district. Later battalions recruited from the entire Shahabad area (the present day districts of Bhojpur (Arrah), Buxar, Rohtas & Kaimur in Bihar). Their success in combat impressed Mir Kasim, the Nawab of Bengal from 1760 to 1763, who began raising units trained in western combat techniques. Bihari battalions raised by Mir Kasim defeated the British in some engagements. The Bihari, or Purbiya, soldiers thereafter made up the backbone of the Bengal Infantry of the British Colonial Army.

They were not only excellent soldiers but also quick to learn and apply the tactical drills with initiative. They were disciplined when led by good officers but capable of hostility when their beliefs and customs were disregarded. The Indian Rebellion of 1857 against the introduction of greased cartridges (thought to be done so with a mixture of beef and pork fat—abhorrent to Hindus and Muslims), was led by Bihari troops, who preferred being blown by the guns exploding to losing their faith. Thereafter, Biharis were not encouraged to enter military service by the British until after World War I.

Their victories at home including those of Buxar, Karnatic and Maratha Wars along with those in Malaya, Sumatra and Egypt won them laurels.

Composition and Recruitment 

As the name suggests, Bihar Regiment only recruits from the state of old Bihar (i.e. present-day Bihar and Jharkhand). Most of the troops are from the state of present-day Bihar, around 90%, and 10% are from present-day Jharkhand.

Bihar Regiment Controversy 
In 2020, a controversy arose when the Bihar Regiment was associated with only Bihar state and not the country as a whole. Following this incident, Sanjay Raut, a Shiv Sena member of parliament said that an army regiment, regardless of its name, belongs to a nation, not a state. It should not be assumed that the sacrifices of the Bihar Regiment are only the responsibility of the state of Bihar because each regiment has people from different parts of the country.

History 

The Bihar Regiment was formed in 1941 during World War II by regularising the 11th (Territorial) Battalion, 19th Hyderabad Regiment as the 1st Battalion Bihar Regiment. The 2nd Battalion was raised in 1942.

Crest of the Regiment 
The Bihar Regiment's crest was adopted from the three headed lions of Ashoka. Captain Habibullah Khan Khattak, as acting Commanding Officer, 1st Bihar Battalion (Later Major General in Pak Army) selected the crest in 1941. In 1945, the then Governor of Bihar, Sir Thomas Rutherford when visiting 1st Bihar at Shillong was so impressed with the regimental crest, that he requested Lt. Colonel Habibullah Khan Khattak's permission to adopt the emblem for the Bihar Government. The Bihar Government then published gazette notification in May 1945 adopting the crest. Post Independence, Government of India too adopted the three headed Ashoka lions as Government of India Crest.

Bihar Regiment in World War II

The newly raised 1 Bihar saw action in the Burma Campaign. The battalion was part of the famous Lushai Brigade and captured Haka on 19 October 1944 and Gangaw on 11 January 1945. 2 Bihar formed part of Operation Zipper under Lieutenant Colonel (Later Lieutenant General) Sant Singh for the reoccupation of British Malaya.

In recognition of the gallant actions, the Battalion was awarded two Battle Honours namely HAKA and GANGAW and was also bestowed with the Theatre Honour of Burma.

History after Independence

Thereafter, both battalions participated in the Indo-Pakistani War of 1947 in the Kashmir Valley during 1948–49.

During the Indo-Pakistani War of 1965, 7 Bihar captured Bedori, paving the way for the capture of Haji Pir Pass.

By the start of the Indo-Pakistani War of 1971, the Regiment had expanded to 11 battalions. The sixth, seventh, eighth, tenth and eleventh battalions participated in operations in the eastern sector. 10 Bihar was conferred the theatre honour 'East Pakistan' for the capture of Akhaura. On 15 December 1971, a seaborne expedition was launched at Cox's Bazar to prevent Pakistani troops from escaping into Burma. 11 Bihar formed part of this amphibious task force. In the Western theatre of the war, 3 Bihar captured Wanjal.

In the Spring of 1999, Pakistani soldiers posing as Kashmiri militants crossed the Line of Control (LoC) in Kargil and entered Indian territory. Operation Vijay was launched by the Indian Army to flush out the intruders. More than 10,000 soldiers and officers of the Bihar Regiment were deployed to Kargil. In a well-planned operation in the Batalik sector, soldiers of 1 Bihar, in a fierce fight with the Pakistan Army, captured Point 4268 and Jubar Ridge in Kuker Thang area in the Batalik sector on the night 06/7 July 1999.

On the night of 15 June 2020, soldiers of 16 Bihar Regiment were involved in a bloody skirmish at Galwan Valley, in Ladakh along the Line of Actual Control (LAC). Twenty Indian soldiers were killed, including the commanding-officer of 16 Bihar Colonel B. Santosh Babu. According to Russian government owned TASS news agency, the fighting resulted in death of 45 Chinese soldiers. As per an American intelligence assessment the skirmish led to the death of 35 Chinese soldiers including a commanding officer.

Units of the regiment have also served in UN Peacekeeping operations in Somalia (UNOSOM) and the Democratic Republic of Congo (MONUC).

Deployments of units of the Bihar Regiment 
Burma Campaign, World War II
Operation Zipper, World War II
Indo-Pakistan War of 1947
Sino-Indian War
Indo-Pakistan War of 1965
Indo-Pakistan War of 1971
UNOSOM
Kargil War
MONUC
Insurgency in Jammu and Kashmir
2016 Indian Line of Control strike
2020 China–India skirmishes

Units 
Regimental Battalions:

Distinctions

Battle and theatre honours

 Battle honour Haka, awarded for Burma Campaign, World War II 
 Battle honour Gangaw, also awarded for Burma Campaign, World War II.
 Theatre honour Burma 1942-45
 Theatre honour East Pakistan 1971
 Battle honour Batalik
 Theatre honour Kargil

Gallantry awards
The regiment is one of the highly decorated regiments of the Indian Army. The tally of awards till date are as under:-

Pre-Independence

(i)   Distinguished Service Order (DSO ) - 07

(ii)   Member of the Order of the British Empire (MBE) -  08

(iii)  Military Cross (MC) -05

(iv)  Order of British India (OBI) - 06

(v)   Military Medal (MM) -   09

Post Independence

(i)    Ashoka Chakra (AC) - 04

(ii)   Param Vishisht Seva Medal (PVSM) - 35

(iii)   Maha Vir Chakra (MVC) - 09

(iv)   Kirti Chakra (KC) - 21

(v)  Ati Vishisht Seva Medal (AVSM ) - 49

(vi)  Vir Chakra  (VrC ) - 51

(vii)  Shaurya Chakra (SC) - 70

(viii) Yudh Seva Medal (YSM) - 09

(ix)  Sena Medal (SM)- 448

(x)   Jivan Rakshak Padak - 07

(xi)  Vishisht Seva Medal (VSM) - 42

(xii)  Mention in Despatches  - 45

Name of the awardees of prominent awards from the regiment are as given below:

Ashoka Chakra 

 Lieutenant Colonel Harsh Uday Singh Gaur (Posthumous), 10 Bihar, Baramulla district, 1994
 Lieutenant Colonel Shanti Swaroop Rana (Posthumous), 3 Bihar, Kupwara district, 1997
Major Sandeep Unnikrishnan (Posthumous), 7 Bihar (on deputation to NSG), Operation Black Tornado.
Captain Arun Singh Jasrotia (Posthumous), 8 Bihar later 9 PARA SF, 1995 Kashmir.

Maha Vir Chakra
 Capt Gurjinder Singh Suri, MVC (Posthumous), 12 BIHAR, Kargil War
 Colonel Bikumalla Santosh Babu, MVC (Posthumous), 16 BIHAR ( Op Snow Leopard)
Lieutenant General Joginder Singh Gharaya, MVC, KC, VSM, 1 BIHAR, Indo-Pak War of 1971

Vir Chakra

 Major Mariappan Saravanan (Posthumous), 1 BIHAR, Kargil War
Naik Ganesh Prasad Yadav, VrC, 1 BIHAR, Operation Vijay, Kargil War (1999).
 Colonel M Ravi, 10 BIHAR, 1971 East Pakistan (Later Bangladesh)
 Lt Col K P R Hari, 10 BIHAR
 Lt. Col. P.C. Sawhney, 10 BIHAR,1971 East Pakistan (Later Bangladesh)
 Maj (Later Maj.Gen.) D.P.Singh, 10 BIHAR,1971 East Pakistan (Later Bangladesh)
 Maj Harpal Singh Grewal (Posthumous), 8 BIHAR, 1971 East Pakistan (Later Bangladesh)
 Sub Ghama Oraon, 1 BIHAR, Sri Lanka
Naik Shatrughan Singh, 1 BIHAR, Batalik sector, Kargil war (1999)
Col P K Sinha, 15 BIHAR, Sri Lanka
 Nb Sub Nudu Ram Soren, VrC (Posthumous), 16 BIHAR, (Op Snow Leopard)
 NA Nk Deepak Kumar, VrC (Posthumous), 16 BIHAR, (Op Snow Leopard)

See also 
 St Luke's Church, Patna, Bihar

References

B
Bihar
Military units and formations established in 1941
Indian World War II regiments